Thomas Newbold may refer to:

 Thomas Newbold (New Jersey politician) (1760–1823), U.S. Representative from New Jersey
 Thomas Newbold (New York politician) (1849–1929), American lawyer, politician, and society leader during the Gilded Age
 Thomas John Newbold (1807–1850), English soldier, traveller and orientalist